The California State Depository Library Program is a materials distribution program administered by the California State Library with the goal of making documents published by the California state government available to all California residents. Participating libraries are obliged to keep physical copies of distributed materials and make them available to patrons at no cost until such materials are authorized to be discarded by the California State Library.

History and structure of program 
The program was authorized by the California Legislature in the 1945 Library Distribution Act and is codified in the California Government Code. By law, California government agencies must send two copies of all publications they release to the California State Archivist. Such publications include "any document, compilation, journal, law, resolution, Blue Book, statute, code, register, pamphlet, list, book, report, memorandum, hearing, legislative bill, leaflet, order, regulation, directory, periodical, or magazine, in physical or electronic format," issued by the state government or prepared for the state government by independent third parties.

Municipal public libraries, public college and university libraries, and private college and university libraries are eligible apply to participate in the program. Institutions applying to participate in the program attest to be able to provide "adequate facilities for the storage and use of the publications" and make them accessible to patrons at no cost. A "complete depository" receives one copy of every physical state publication, while a "selective depository" receives one copy of physical state publications from agencies selected by the library.

Law libraries affiliated with courts or law schools may also apply to participate in the program, with such institutions' participation also requiring the maintenance of "basic legal documents," which include "legislative bills, legislative committee hearings and reports, legislative journals, statutes, administrative reports, California Administrative Code and Register, annual reports of state agencies and other legal materials published by the state."

List of participating libraries 
As of September 2021, 102 libraries participate in the distribution program: 15 complete depositories and 87 selective depositories.

See also 
 California State Library

References